Las Americas Premium Outlets is a  outlet mall in San Ysidro, San Diego, California located directly on the Mexico–United States border just west of the San Ysidro Port of Entry at the new PedWest crossing from Tijuana to Virginia Avenue on the U.S. side.

The center attracts shoppers from San Diego County, California as well as the Tijuana metropolitan area in Mexico immediately to the south.

In 2013, the Shamrock Group opened the  Plaza at the Border on Las Americas' west side, which includes a Ross Dress for Less and TJ Maxx, while on the east side immediately adjacent to the border crossing is the smaller  Outlets at the Border, which opened in the fall of 2014.

References

Shopping malls in San Diego County, California
Outlet malls in the United States
Premium Outlets
Shopping malls established in 2001
2001 establishments in California